Graham Cox (26 June 1933 – 11 June 1973) was an  Australian rules footballer who played with Richmond in the Victorian Football League (VFL).

Notes

External links 

1933 births
1973 deaths
Australian rules footballers from Victoria (Australia)
Richmond Football Club players